The America Zone was one of the two regional zones of the 1928 International Lawn Tennis Challenge.

6 teams entered the America Zone, with the winner going on to compete in the Inter-Zonal Final against the winner of the Europe Zone. The United States defeated Japan in the final, and went on to face Italy in the Inter-Zonal Final.

Draw

Quarterfinals

Mexico vs. United States

Cuba vs. Japan

Semifinals

United States vs. China

Canada vs. Japan

Final

United States vs. Japan

References

External links
Davis Cup official website

Davis Cup Americas Zone
America Zone
International Lawn Tennis Challenge